Iacopo Balestri (born 21 June 1975) is an Italian footballer who played for Serie B team Salernitana in the role of a defender. He is 178 cm tall.

Career
Balestri started his career at hometown club Pisa, where he won the Serie D champion. After just played twice at Serie C2, he returned to Serie D for Castelfiorentino. In mid-1999 he moved to Montevarchi of Serie C1, where he was spotted by Modena. At Modena he won two promotion in two season, from Serie C1 to Serie A the Italian top division. At Serie A he was the regular starter in the two seasons. After Modena finished as the second least and relegated, Balestri was signed by another Serie A struggler Reggina. With Reggina, he played 37 out of possible 39 matches for the club and finished in mid-table. After played the first match of 2005–06 season, Torino of Serie B signed Balestri. He won promotion with club again, and secured a place in their Serie A campaign. In July 2007 he left for Serie B club Mantova, and continued to play as a regular.

Balestri was released in June 2009. After without a club for 6 months, he signed a 6 months contract with option of 1 more year with Serie B bottom club Salernitana.

Honours
Serie C1: 2001
Serie D: 1996

References

External links
Balestri's profile from Gazzetta dello Sport 
http://aic.football.it/scheda/2260/balestri-jacopo.htm

Italian footballers
Pisa S.C. players
Modena F.C. players
Reggina 1914 players
Torino F.C. players
Mantova 1911 players
U.S. Salernitana 1919 players
Serie A players
Serie B players
Serie C players
Association football defenders
Sportspeople from Pisa
1975 births
Living people
Footballers from Tuscany